The 2019 Copa Sudamericana second stage was played from 21 to 30 May 2019. A total of 32 teams competed in the second stage to decide the 16 places in the final stages of the 2019 Copa Sudamericana.

Draw

The draw for the second stage was held on 13 May 2019, 20:30 PYT (UTC−4), at the CONMEBOL Convention Centre in Luque, Paraguay. For the second stage, the teams were allocated to two pots according to their previous results in this season:
Pot 1: 10 teams transferred from the Copa Libertadores and six best winners of the first stage from the Copa Sudamericana
Pot 2: 16 remaining winners of the first stage from the Copa Sudamericana
The 32 teams were drawn into 16 ties (O1–O16) between a team from Pot 1 and a team from Pot 2, with the teams from Pot 1 hosting the second leg. Teams from the same association could be drawn into the same tie.

The following were the 10 teams transferred from the Copa Libertadores (two best teams eliminated in the third stage of qualifying and eight third-placed teams in the group stage).

The following were the 22 winners of the first stage from the Copa Sudamericana. Matches in the first stage were considered for the ranking of teams for the second stage draw.

Format

In the second stage, each tie was played on a home-and-away two-legged basis. If tied on aggregate, the away goals rule was used. If still tied, extra time was not played, and a penalty shoot-out was used to determine the winner (Regulations Article 27).

The 16 winners of the second stage advanced to the round of 16 of the final stages.

Matches
The first legs were played on 21–23 May, and the second legs were played on 28–30 May 2019.

|}

Match O1

La Equidad won 4–1 on aggregate and advanced to the round of 16 (Match A).

Match O2

Independiente del Valle won 7–3 on aggregate and advanced to the round of 16 (Match B).

Match O3

Fluminense won 4–2 on aggregate and advanced to the round of 16 (Match C).

Match O4

Sporting Cristal won 6–0 on aggregate and advanced to the round of 16 (Match D).

Match O5

Argentinos Juniors won 1–0 on aggregate and advanced to the round of 16 (Match E).

Match O6

Montevideo Wanderers won 1–0 on aggregate and advanced to the round of 16 (Match F).

Match O7

Universidad Católica won 6–0 on aggregate and advanced to the round of 16 (Match G).

Match O8

Tied 1–1 on aggregate, Atlético Mineiro won on penalties and advanced to the round of 16 (Match H).

Match O9

Botafogo won 5–0 on aggregate and advanced to the round of 16 (Match H).

Match O10

Independiente won 4–3 on aggregate and advanced to the round of 16 (Match G).

Match O11

Corinthians won 4–0 on aggregate and advanced to the round of 16 (Match F).

Match O12

Colón won 3–1 on aggregate and advanced to the round of 16 (Match E).

Match O13

Zulia won 3–1 on aggregate and advanced to the round of 16 (Match D).

Match O14

Peñarol won 3–1 on aggregate and advanced to the round of 16 (Match C).

Match O15

Caracas won 2–1 on aggregate and advanced to the round of 16 (Match B).

Match O16

Tied 3–3 on aggregate, Royal Pari won on away goals and advanced to the round of 16 (Match A).

Notes

References

External links
CONMEBOL Sudamericana 2019, CONMEBOL.com

2
May 2019 sports events in South America